Dejan Bojkov (born 3 July 1977) is a Bulgarian grandmaster and chess author. He earned his grandmaster title in 2008 and won the 48th Canadian Open Chess Championship in 2011. He worked for Antoaneta Stefanova as her trainer.

Bibliography

References

External links
 
 
 
 

1977 births
Living people
Chess grandmasters
Bulgarian chess players
People from Shumen